Anomalochromis is a genus of fish in the family Cichlidae, containing the single species Anomalochromis thomasi, the African butterfly cichlid. The natural habitat of A. thomasi is Sierra Leone, Liberia and Guinea, mainly in smaller streams. The fish are typically found in slightly acidic, oxygen rich water with other west African cichlid genera such as Hemichromis and Pelvicachromis.

This species is found in forest streams, shaded by dense overhanging vegetation where the water is heavily stained with tannins from decaying organic matter and is coloured like tea. In these streams the temperature of the water can approach  in the dry season. It can also occur in streams in forest edge habitats. They form pairs which spawn into the substrate. These pairs are territorial, the female selects a laying site on a leaf or flat rock which she and the male clean and after laying the brood is mainly cared for by the female, although the male sometimes relieves her. After hatching the young are moved to one of a number of depressions in the substrate created by their parents. The fry will be moved to several of these pits in the 72 hours from hatching until they become free swimming.

The specific name of this species honours the English aquatic technician W. Thomas (born 1965, the collector of the type.

See also
List of freshwater aquarium fish species

References

Hemichromini
Fish described in 1916
Taxa named by Humphry Greenwood
Cichlid genera
Monotypic ray-finned fish genera